Spiniluma discolor is a species of plant in the family Sapotaceae. It is endemic to Socotra.  Its natural habitat is subtropical or tropical dry forests.

References

Endemic flora of Socotra
Chrysophylloideae
Vulnerable plants
Taxonomy articles created by Polbot